Dominik Baldauf (born 23 April 1992) is an Austrian cross-country skier from Sulzberg. He competed in the World Cup 2015 season and represented Austria at the FIS Nordic World Ski Championships 2015 in Falun and again in the 2017 World Championships in Lahti.

He competed in the FIS Nordic World Ski Championships 2019 in Seefeld before being arrested for blood doping along with his teammate Max Hauke and three other athletes from Estonia and Kazakhstan. In July 2019, Baldauf was handed a 4-year ban by the Austrian Anti-Doping Commission (ÖADR).

World Cup results
All results are sourced from the International Ski Federation (FIS).

World Cup standings

References

External links 
 

1992 births
Living people
Austrian male cross-country skiers
Austrian sportspeople in doping cases
Place of birth missing (living people)
Cross-country skiers at the 2018 Winter Olympics
Olympic cross-country skiers of Austria
Doping cases in cross-country skiing
Sportspeople from Vorarlberg
People from Bregenz District
21st-century Austrian people